Bess Whitehead Scott (December 13, 1890 – December 27, 1997) was an American journalist from the early to mid 20th century. Scott is known for her accomplishments in reporting, public relations, advertising, and teaching. Scott is a noteworthy figure because she influenced journalism for women, and helped demonstrate that women are capable in the workplace.

Biography

Without any newspaper background, in 1915 Scott became the first female news reporter at The Houston Post. She talked her way into the job by reminding the company that all male reporters would be called to service in World War 1. At the time, most Texas newspapers only hired women for society and club reporting. She continued her journalism career until 1940.

She later taught journalism at Milby High School in Houston and worked in advertising during World War II. She also had a career as an author, writing two screenplays, two journalism textbooks, and an autobiography. She helped establish and served as the editor at the Texas Federation of Business and Professional Women.

Awards
Distinguished Alumna recognition, Baylor University (1992)
Outstanding Alumna recognition, University of Mary Hardin-Baylor (1992)
Member of the Texas Women's Hall of Fame (1994)

Bess Whitehead Scholarship Fund
The Bess Whitehead Scholarship Fund was created in her honor in 1991.

References

1890 births
1997 deaths
Baylor University alumni
American women journalists
20th-century American journalists
20th-century American women writers
Journalists from Texas
University of Mary Hardin–Baylor alumni
American centenarians
Women centenarians